Giovanni Cataldo Parisio, commonly known as Cataldo Parisio or Cataldo Siculo, (c. 1455 in Palermo or Sciacca – 1517 in Lisbon) was a Sicilian humanist, writer and diplomat. He introduced the humanist culture in Portugal and became the secretary of king John II of Portugal.

External links 
 PARISIO, Cataldo, Dizionario Biografico degli Italiani

Writers from Palermo
Italian humanists
Portuguese Renaissance writers
1455 births
1517 deaths